T. Frederick Campbell was an English professional footballer who played as a full back. He was born in Burnley and played in the Football League for his hometown club during the 1905–06 season.

References

Footballers from Burnley
English footballers
Association football defenders
Burnley F.C. players
Queens Park Rangers F.C. players
English Football League players
Year of death missing
Year of birth missing